You Are the Avalanche is the first extended play from John Mark & Sarah McMillan. Lionhawk Records released the EP on June 23, 2015.

Critical reception

Awarding the EP four stars at CCM Magazine, Matt Conner states, "Consider this EP as a beautiful bookend." Bobby Gillies, giving the EP four and a half stars for Worship Leader, writes, "the McMillan's are eager to explore in their skilled biblically-informed poetry." Rating the EP four stars from Jesus Freak Hideout, Mark Rice says, "With five excellent potential additions to a Sunday morning lineup, all of which are very well-done and better in quality than most worship music".

Accolades
The song, "Heart Won't Stop", was No. 9 on the Worship Leader's Top 20 Songs of 2015 list.

Track listing

Chart performance

References

2015 debut EPs
John Mark McMillan albums